is the sixteenth studio album by Japanese heavy metal band Loudness. It was released in 2001 only in Japan. All music is credited to Loudness and all lyrics to Niihara.

Track listing
"Ya Stepped on a Mine" - 3:44
"Bloody Doom" - 5:56
"The Pandemonium" - 4:34
"Vision" - 4:57
"What's the Truth?" - 4:08
"Suicide Doll" - 6:45
"Chaos" - 4:47
"The Candidate" - 5:09
"Real Man" - 6:04
"Inflame" - 4:41
"Snake Venom" - 4:56

Personnel
Loudness
Minoru Niihara - vocals
Akira Takasaki - guitars
Masayoshi Yamashita - bass 
Munetaka Higuchi - drums

Production
Takafumi Yamada - co-producer
Masatoshi Sakimoto - engineer, mixing
Kenichi Nakamura, Nobuko Shimura, Shinichi Naitō, Tadashi Hashimoto, Yukiko Matsushita - assistant engineers
Seigen Ono - mastering
Chiyomi Shibata, Eiichi Yamakawa - executive producers
Shannon Higgins, Bob Dyer, John Fotos - lyrics translations

References

2001 albums
Loudness (band) albums
Nippon Columbia albums